Joseph William Mongan (4 March 1880 – 12 March 1951) was an Irish politician. He was an unsuccessful candidate at the June 1927 general election, but was elected to Dáil Éireann as a Cumann na nGaedheal Teachta Dála (TD) for the Galway constituency at the September 1927 general election. He was re-elected at the 1932 general election but lost his seat at the 1933 general election. 

At the 1937 general election, he was elected as a Fine Gael TD for the Galway West constituency. He was re-elected at each subsequent general election and served until his death in 1951. No by-election was held for his seat.

References

1880 births
1951 deaths
Cumann na nGaedheal TDs
Fine Gael TDs
Members of the 6th Dáil
Members of the 7th Dáil
Members of the 9th Dáil
Members of the 10th Dáil
Members of the 11th Dáil
Members of the 12th Dáil
Members of the 13th Dáil
Politicians from County Galway